Anugerah Planet Muzik (literally: "Music Planet Award"), commonly known by the acronym APM, is a Singaporean award ceremony for artists engaged in the music industries of the Malay-speaking region in Southeast Asia (also known as the Nusantara); the awards nominate singers from countries within said region which are Singapore, Malaysia and Indonesia. 

Organised by MediaCorp's Malay Broadcast Division, Suria, Warna 94.2FM & Ria 89.7FM, the ceremony recognises achievements in the regional Malay-Indonesia music industry. APM is supported by Media Development Authority of Singapore (MDA), Composers and Authors Society of Singapore (COMPASS) and Indonesian Music Award Foundation (YAMI).

The event was first held in 2001 and has been held every year (except in 2010). Awards are given in various categories. There are awards covering all the participating countries and there are also awards for particular countries. In year 2005, for the very first time an artist from Brunei, Faiz Nawi, was invited as a performer at this awards event. It was only in 2013, after an eight-year break, that another Bruneian artist, Jaz Hayat, was given the honours to perform at the said event. 

The first artist from Brunei (Aziz Harun) and Philippines (Mark Adam) both were nominated in Best New Artiste at Anugerah Planet Muzik 2015. However, the first songwriter and award winner from the Philippines who was nominated fell to Judah Lyne from The Lion Story. She has since won five awards for Best Singapore Song in 2011, 2015–2018. In 2016 edition, Shunpei Nakagawa  from Japan was the first artist from others region nominated for the awards.

Host country

Award categories

Fans' Choice

Singapore Awards
 Most Popular Singapore Artiste
 Most Popular Singapore Song

Regional Awards
 APM Most Popular Artiste
 APM Most Popular Song
 Social Media Icon

Judge Category

Regional Awards
 Best New Artiste (Male)
 Best New Artiste (Female)
 Best Collaboration (Artist)
 Best Collaboration (Song)
 Best Male Artiste
 Best Female Artiste
 Best Duo/Group
 Best Band
 APM Best Song
 Best Song Malaysia
 Best Song Indonesia
 Best Song Singapore

Special awards 
 Special Awards
 Anugerah Cipta
 APM Humanity Award
 Anugerah Rentas Planet

Defunct Awards
 Best Album (2001-2011)
 Best New Duo/Group
 Radio Hits of The Year (2012)
 New Media Nova
 Best Artiste (Singapore)
 Best Album (Singapore)

Award winners

Best Song

Best Male & Female Artiste

Best Duo/Group & Band

Best New Artiste

Best Collaboration

APM Most Popular Artiste

APM Most Popular Song

Social Media Icon
The award was first given in the 11th edition of APM as "New Media Icon". It was renamed to "Social Media Icon" in the 12th edition.

International Breakthru Artiste Award (Anugerah Rentas Planet)

The award is given to artist with significant international successes outside the region.

See also 
 Similar awards
 Anugerah Industri Muzik
 Anugerah Musik Indonesia
 Anugerah Planet Muzik 2009

References

External links 
 APM 2014 on MediaCorp

Singaporean music awards
Malaysian music awards
Indonesian music awards
Malay-language music
Awards established in 2001